Peter A. Hammen (born July 1, 1966) is an American politician who represented the 46th legislative district in the Maryland House of Delegates. Delegate Hammen was also the Chairman of the House Health and Government Operations Committee.

Background

Born in Baltimore, Maryland on July 1, 1966, Hammen attended the University of Baltimore and earned his B.S. in criminal justice in 1989 and his M.P.A. in public administration in 1993.

In the legislature
Delegate Hammen was a member of House of Delegates from January 11, 1995 to December 2016. He initially served on the House Environmental Matters Committee and then moved to the House Health and Government Operations Committee in 2003. He served as that committee's chairman from 2005 to 2016. He was the House Co-Chair of the Joint Legislative Task Force on Small-Group Market Health Insurance. Hammen resigned his seat in December 2016 to take a job in the administration of Baltimore Mayor Catherine Pugh.

Legislative notes
Co-sponsored HB 860 (Baltimore City Public Schools Construction and Revitalization Act of 2013). Signed by the Governor on May 16, 2013, the new law approved 1.1 billion dollars to construct new schools in Baltimore City.
voted for HB6, requiring custodial interrogations in capital cases be recorded(2008) 
voted for Higher Education-Tuition Charges-Maryland High School Students(2007) (HB6)
co-sponsored House Bill 30 in 2007-Maryland Education Fund - Establishment and Funding 
 voted for the Tax Reform Act of 2007(HB2)
 voted in favor of prohibiting ground rents in 2007(SB106)
voted for the Clean Indoor Air Act of 2007 (HB359) 
 voted for Healthy Air Act in 2006 (SB154) 
 voted against slots in 2005 (HB1361)
 voted for income tax reduction in 1998 (SB750)

General election results, 2006
2006 Race for Maryland House of Delegates – 46th District
Voters to choose three:
{| class="wikitable"
|-
!Name
!Votes
!Percent
!Outcome
|-
|-
|Peter A. Hammen, Dem.
|15,883
|  29.6%
|   Won
|-
|-
|Carolyn J. Krysiak, Dem.
|15,856
|  29.6%
|   Won
|-
|-
|Brian K. McHale, Dem.
|13,921
|  29.0%
|   Won
|-
|-
|Peter Kimos, Rep.
|6,219
|  11.6%
|   Lost
|-
|Other Write-Ins 
|154
|  0.3%
|   
|-
|}

Awards
2010 Most Influential Maryland Legislators (Top 20)

Notes

Democratic Party members of the Maryland House of Delegates
Politicians from Baltimore
1966 births
Living people
University of Baltimore alumni
21st-century American politicians